Aulacophora nigripennis is a species of leaf beetle in the genus Aulacophora.

Description

The beetle is relatively small with a hard, black exoskeleton containing faint yellowish dots around the sides. The head is a deep, bright orange, while A. nigripennis has a large orange compartmentalized thorax.

Feeding

A. nigripennis is a pest that feeds off of the 28 species in the Dianthus and Tricosantes genera of plants by creating a circular "trench" using its mandibles. After circularly cutting through the leaf, the trench overflows with sticky phloem sap that, through cohesion, sticks to form a semicircle around the beetle. The beetle then sucks the sap using its mouth.

Pest control

Researchers at the Journal of the Japanese Society for Horticultural Science have conducted research in using "trap plants" to kill off and reduce the numbers of A. nigripennis. Because A. nigripennis is attracted particularly to Dianthus pungens in the Dianthus genera, D. pungens trap plants were the most effective, reducing the population of A. nigripennis from 1.5 beetles per 100 carnation plants to a mere 0.1 beetles, a 93.3% reduction.

References

N
Beetles described in 1857
Taxa named by Victor Motschulsky